Holset may refer to:

 Holset Engineering was a British engineering company, now Cummins
 Holset, Netherlands, a village